100s may refer to:

 The period from 100 to 199 AD, almost synonymous with the 2nd century (101–200)
 The period from 100 to 109 AD, known as the 100s (decade) almost synonymous with the 11th decade (101–110)
 The period from 199 to 100 BC, synonymous with the 2nd century BC
 The period from 109 to 100 BC, known as the 100s BC (decade)
 100mm cigarettes, a tobacco product
 100s (rapper) or Kossisko, American rapper
 One-hundred-base-unit banknotes

See also

 100 (disambiguation)
 100 series (disambiguation)